Paulo Cavalheiro (6 May 1934 – 18 June 1989) was a Brazilian boxer. He competed in the men's light middleweight event at the 1952 Summer Olympics.

References

1934 births
1989 deaths
Brazilian male boxers
Olympic boxers of Brazil
Boxers at the 1952 Summer Olympics
Place of birth missing
Light-middleweight boxers